Damon Francis Knight (September 19, 1922 – April 15, 2002) was an American science fiction author, editor, and critic.  He is the author of "To Serve Man", a 1950 short story adapted for The Twilight Zone.  He was married to fellow writer Kate Wilhelm.

Biography
Knight was born in Baker City, Oregon, in 1922, and grew up in Hood River, Oregon. He entered science-fiction fandom at the age of eleven and published two issues of a fanzine titled Snide.

Knight's first professional sale was a cartoon drawing to a science-fiction magazine, Amazing Stories.  His first story, "The Itching Hour", appeared in the Summer 1940 number of Futuria Fantasia, edited and published by Ray Bradbury.  "Resilience" followed in the February 1941 number of Stirring Science Stories, edited by Donald A. Wollheim.  An editorial error made the latter story's ending incomprehensible; it was reprinted in a 1978 magazine in four pages with a two-page introduction by Knight.

At the time of his first story sale he was living in New York and was a member of the Futurians. One of his short stories describes paranormal disruption of a science fiction fan group and contains cameo appearances of various Futurians and others under thinly-disguised names; for instance, non-Futurian SF writer H. Beam Piper is identified as "H. Dreyne Fifer".

Knight's forte was the short story; he is widely acknowledged as having been a master of the genre.  To the general public he is best known as the author of "To Serve Man", a 1950 short story adapted for The Twilight Zone.  It won a 50-year Retro-Hugo in 2001 as the best short story of 1950. Knight was also a science fiction critic, a career which began when he wrote in 1945 that A. E. van Vogt "is not a giant as often maintained. He's only a pygmy who has learned to operate an overgrown typewriter." He ceased reviewing when Fantasy & Science Fiction refused to publish his review of Judith Merril's novel The Tomorrow People. These reviews were later collected in In Search of Wonder.

Algis Budrys wrote that Knight and "William Atheling Jr." (James Blish) had "transformed the reviewer's trade in the field", in Knight's case "without the guidance of his own prior example". The term "idiot plot", a story that only functions because almost everyone in it is an idiot, became well known through Knight's frequent use of it in his reviews, though he believed the term was probably invented by Blish. Knight's only non-Retro-Hugo Award was for "Best Reviewer" in 1956.

Knight was the founder of the Science Fiction and Fantasy Writers of America (SFWA), cofounder of the National Fantasy Fan Federation, cofounder of the Milford Writer's Workshop, and cofounder of the Clarion Writers Workshop.  The SFWA officers and past presidents named Knight its 13th Grand Master in 1994 (presented 1995).  After his death, the associated award was renamed the Damon Knight Memorial Grand Master Award in his honor.  The Science Fiction Hall of Fame inducted him in 2003.

Until his death, Knight lived in Eugene, Oregon, with his second wife, author Kate Wilhelm.  His papers are held in the University of Oregon Special Collections and University Archive.

Selected works

Novels
 Hell's Pavement (1955)
 A for Anything (1961) (original version titled The People Maker, 1959)
 Masters of Evolution (1959)
 The Sun Saboteurs (1961)
 Beyond the Barrier (1964)
 Mind Switch (1965)
 Double Meaning (1965)
 The Earth Quarter (1970)
 World without Children (1970)
 The World and Thorinn (1980)
 The Man in the Tree (1984)
 CV (1985)
 The Observers (1988)
 A Reasonable World (1991)
 God's Nose (1991)
 Why Do Birds (1992)
 Humpty Dumpty: An Oval (1996)

Short stories and other writings
 "The Third Little Green Man" (1948)
 "PS's Feature Flash" (1948)
 "Not with a Bang" (1949)
 "To Serve Man" (1950)
 "Ask Me Anything" (1951)
 "Don't Live in the Past" (1951)
 "Cabin Boy" (1951)
 "Catch that Martian" (1952)
 "The Analogues" (1952)
 "Beachcomber" (1952)
 "Ticket to Anywhere" (1952)
 "Anachron" (1953)
 "Babel II" (1953)
 "Four in One" (1953)
 "Special Delivery" (1953)
 "Natural State" (1954)
 "Rule Golden" (1954)
 "The Country of the Kind" (1955)
 "Dulcie and Decorum" (1955)
 "You're Another" (1955)
 "This way to the Regress (1956)
 "Extempore" (1956)
 "The Last Word" (1956)
 "Stranger Station" (1956)
 "Dio" (1957)
 "The Dying Man" (1957)
 "An Eye for a What?" (1957)
 "The Enemy" (1958)
 "Be My Guest" (1958)
 "Eripmav" (1958)
 "Idiot Stick" (1958)
 "Thing of Beauty" (1958)
 "To Be Continued" (1959)
 "The Handler" (1960)
 "Time Enough" (1960)
 "Auto-Da-Fe" (1961)
 A Century of Science Fiction (1962) (editor)
 "The Visitor at the Zoo" (1963)
 "The Big Pat Boom" (1963)
 "An Ancient Madness" (1964)
 God's Nose (1964)
 Maid to Measure (1964)
 "Shall the Dust Praise Thee?" (1967)
 "Masks'" (1968)
 "The Star Below" (1968)
 I See You (1976)
 Forever (1981)
 O (1983)
 Point of View (1985) (Illustrated by Chris Van Allsburg)
 Strangers on Paradise (1986)
 Not a Creature (1993)
 Fortyday (1994)
 Life Edit (1996)
 "Double Meaning"
 "In the Beginning"

Literary criticism and analysis
 In Search of Wonder (1956) (collected reviews and critical pieces)
 Creating Short Fiction (1981) (advice on writing short stories)
 Turning Points (editor/contributor: critical anthology)
 Orbit (editor)
 The Futurians (1977, memoir/history)

Short story collections
 Far Out (1961) (contains "To Serve Man")
 In Deep (1963) (contains "The Country of the Kind")
 Off Center (1965) (contains "Be My Guest")
 Turning On (1966)

See also

Notes

References

Sources

External links

Damon Knight – Official Website
 
 
 
 
 
 
 
 
 

1922 births
2002 deaths
American science fiction writers
American speculative fiction critics
American speculative fiction editors
Futurians
Hugo Award-winning writers
Writers from Eugene, Oregon
SFWA Grand Masters
Science fiction critics
Science fiction editors
Science Fiction Hall of Fame inductees
20th-century American novelists
Novelists from Oregon
American male novelists
American male short story writers
People from Hood River, Oregon
20th-century American short story writers
20th-century American male writers
American male non-fiction writers